Dry Point Township is located in Shelby County, Illinois. As of the 2010 census, its population was 1,093 and it contained 463 housing units.

Geography

Adjacent townships
 Lakewood Township (north)
 Holland Township (east)
 Liberty Township, Effingham County (southeast)
 Loudon Township, Fayette County (south)
 Bowling Green Township, Fayette County (south and southwest)
 Herrick Township (west)
 Cold Spring Township (northwest)

Demographics

References

External links
City-data.com
Illinois State Archives

Townships in Shelby County, Illinois
Townships in Illinois